The foreign relations of Angola are based on Angola's strong support of U.S. foreign policy as the Angolan economy is dependent on U.S. foreign aid.
From 1975 to 1989, Angola was aligned with the Eastern bloc, in particular the Soviet Union, Libya, and Cuba. Since then, it has focused on improving relationships with Western countries, cultivating links with other Portuguese-speaking countries, and asserting its own national interests in Central Africa through military and diplomatic intervention. In 1993, it established formal diplomatic relations with the United States. It has entered the Southern African Development Community as a vehicle for improving ties with its largely Anglophone neighbors to the south. Zimbabwe and Namibia joined Angola in its military intervention in the Democratic Republic of the Congo, where Angolan troops remain in support of the Joseph Kabila government. It also has intervened in the Republic of the Congo (Brazzaville) in support of Denis Sassou-Nguesso in the civil war.

Since 1998, Angola has successfully worked with the United Nations Security Council to impose and carry out sanctions on UNITA. More recently, it has extended those efforts to controls on conflict diamonds, the primary source of revenue for UNITA during the Civil War that ended in 2002. At the same time, Angola has promoted the revival of the Community of Portuguese-Speaking Countries (CPLP) as a forum for cultural exchange and expanding ties with Portugal (its former ruler) and Brazil (which shares many cultural affinities with Angola) in particular. Angola is a member of the Port Management Association of Eastern and Southern Africa (PMAESA).

Africa

Americas

Asia

Europe

Oceania

See also
 List of diplomatic missions in Angola
 List of diplomatic missions of Angola
 Visa requirements for Angolan citizens

References

External links